Quartet is a second collaboration album of guitarists Peter Rowan and Tony Rice. On this record, the duo becomes a quartet with the addition of mandolinist Sharon Gilchrist and bassist Bryn Davies, both of whom sing as well. The band continues to deliver intimate, bluegrass-folk style music on a very high level.

Track listing 

 "Dust Bowl Children" (Rowan) 4:45
 "To Live Is to Fly" (VanZandt) 3:47
 "The Walls of Time" (Monroe, Rowan) 5:46
 "Shady Grove" (trad.) 4:15
 "Moonlight, Midnight" (Rowan) 7:40
 "Trespasses" (Daugherty, Smith) 5:06
 "The Sunny Side of the Mountain" (Gregory, McAuliffe) 3:42
 "Cold Rain and Snow" (trad.) 6:14
 "Guardian Angels" (Pons) 3:24
 "Let the Harvest Go to Seed" (Rowan) 4:56
 "Perfection" (Rowan) 2:41

Personnel
 Tony Rice – guitar
 Peter Rowan - guitar, vocals
 Bryn Davies - bass, vocals
 Sharon Gilchrist - mandolin, vocals

References

2007 albums
Tony Rice albums
Peter Rowan albums
Rounder Records albums